Ezhuthiyatharadi is a 2008 Indian Tamil-language romantic drama film directed by Sri Sathyaragaventher. The film stars Ramana, Mansi Pritam, Swathi and newcomer Akhila, with Ponnambalam, Crane Manohar, A. K. Veerasamy, Peeli Sivam, S. Sriskandarajah, Kovai Sarala and K. R. Savithri playing supporting roles. The film, produced by S. Sriskandarajah who had previously produced Ennavo Pudichirukku (2004), was released on 7 March 2008 after many delays. The film was dubbed into Telugu as Premistu.

Plot
Bharathi (Ramana) arrives in Munnar to work as an estate manager and his assistant Sanjini (Mansi Pritam), who is from Mumbai, helps in his job. One day, a labourer working in the estate dies of snakebite and they cannot save in time so Bharathi arranges a job interview to appoint medical staff. Bharathi then befriends with his assistant Sanjini and he thinks that she in love with him. Meanwhile, Bharathi receives anonymous love letters and an audio cassette of a woman singing. Later, Sanjini tells Bharathi that she considers him like a brother and she ties a rakhi around his wrist thus Bharathi symbolically becomes her brother. Bharathi slowly becomes obsessed with finding the woman who loves him.

Roja (Swathi), a childlike woman full of joy, spends her time roaming with her friends and Bharathi begins to suspect her of being his secret lover. Roja reveals to Bharathi that she is in love with her relative Pulipandi (Ponnambalam), an ex-convict. Roja and Pulipandi then get married and they leave Munnar. When he returns home, Bharathi finds a letter telling him to come to an isolated place. Bharathi comes across a middle-aged woman (K. R. Savithri) and she tells him that she was the one who has written the letters. She also reveals that she is the mother of Devi and tells him everything.

A few months ago, Devi (Akhila) attended the nurse interview and Bharathi who interviewed her praised her for her well-thought answers. Devi instantly fell in love with Bharathi. Devi was a young woman living with her parents and elder sister in the estate. She first told it to her family and they accepted for the marriage. One day, Devi had an epileptic seizure and was admitted to the hospital, the doctors revealed that there was no treatment to cure for epilepsy. Her father then died of a heart attack and her mother decided to support her love at any cost. Thereafter, Devi and her mother decided to meet Bharathi but during the drive, they had an accident and Devi was heavily wounded.

Back to the present, Devi's mother begs him to forget her but Bharathi looks forward to finally see her. Bharathi goes to their place and finds Devi in a pitiful state: Devi has wounds all over her body and has developed an unusual behaviour. The film ends with a weeping Bharathi taking Devi with him.

Cast

Ramana as Bharathi
Mansi Pritam as Sanjini
Swathi as Roja
Akhila as Devi
Ponnambalam as Pulipandi
Crane Manohar as Natarajan
A. K. Veerasami as Mayandi, Roja's grandfather
Peeli Sivam as Devi's father
S. Sriskandarajah as Oomairasu
Kovai Sarala as Ponnumani
K. R. Savithri as Devi's mother
Ram Khan as Rowdy
Minnal Murali as Chitragupta
Bonda Mani as Onappan
Vijay Ganesh as Mani
Appukutty as Roja's friend

Production
S. Sriskandarajah, an NRI, who previously produced Ennavo Pudichirukku (2004), produced this film under the banner SS Good luck films. Swathi plays a deglamour role in the film. The film was shot at Munnar.

Soundtrack

The film score and the soundtrack were composed by Sri Mahan. The soundtrack features 8 tracks.

References

2008 films
2000s Tamil-language films
Indian romantic drama films
2008 directorial debut films
2008 romantic drama films